Peter Beaumont is a British journalist who is the foreign affairs editor of The Observer as well as writing for its sister paper, The Guardian. He has covered wars in Iraq, Afghanistan, Lebanon, Gaza and Kosovo.

Beaumont is the author of The Secret Life of War – Journeys Through Modern Conflict (2009), a memoir of his life as a foreign correspondent working in war zones.

He was played by Matthew Goode in the film Official Secrets (2019).

Awards
 Orwell Prize (2007)
 Amnesty National Press Award 2006
 Webby Award 2011

References

External links

 Beaumont's articles at The Guardian

Year of birth missing (living people)
21st-century English memoirists
English male journalists
Living people
English war correspondents
The Observer people
The Guardian journalists